Şahmalılar (also, Şahmallar, Shakhmalar, Shakhmallar, and Shakkmalar) is a village and the least populous municipality in the Aghjabadi Rayon of Azerbaijan.  It has a population of 227.

References 

Populated places in Aghjabadi District